Jeremy Jackson (born 1980) is an American  actor and singer.

Jeremy Jackson may also refer to:
Jeremy Jackson (scientist) (born 1942), American marine ecologist
Jeremy Jackson (author), American author
Jeremy Jackson (fighter) (born 1982), American mixed martial arts fighter
Jeremy Kent Jackson, American actor

See also
Jerry Jackson (disambiguation)